The sanitary movement of urban planning began in the United Kingdom in 1838, with the Central Poor Law Commission's findings on the "physical causes of fever in the Metropolis which might be prevented by proper sanitary measures". Basing its sanitation beliefs on miasma theory (as opposed to germ theory), its agenda was based on the construction of sewage systems, street-paving, and the provision of clean water. The movement spread to the United States in the 1840s, reaching its peak in 1880 before declining in the 1890s. Edwin Chadwick played a major part in inspiring the movement.
While the sanitary movement never theorized about the model city or urban design, as it was only interested in cities due to their environmental importance for disease, the movement did nevertheless spur a 'townsite consciousness' about certain general principles that cities should follow. These included an open and green setting without crowding or congestion, with access to clean air, water, and exercise opportunities, as well as not having dark and unventilated buildings or polluting industries in built-up areas.

See also 

 History of urban planning
 Sanitation
 History of water supply and sanitation
 History of public health

References 

Urban planning